Gary Nedrow Bender (born September 1, 1940)  is a retired American sportscaster and 2008 inductee into the Kansas Sports Hall of Fame. He officially retired, April 13, 2011, from Fox Sports Arizona after 18 years calling the NBA's Phoenix Suns games.

Biography

Early career
Bender, who was born in Norton, Kansas, and raised in Ulysses, Kansas, graduated from Ulysses High School in 1958. He then attended Wichita State University (then known as the University of Wichita), graduating with a journalism degree in 1962 and a master's degree from the University of Kansas in 1964. Bender then began his broadcasting career calling games at Hutchinson Community College in Hutchinson, Kansas, and then went on to do the same at the University of Kansas' football and basketball programs in the 1960s. He also spent years as a broadcaster in Wisconsin and called all of the Wisconsin Athletic Association championship games, as well as Green Bay Packers radio and Milwaukee Brewers television in the early 1970s.

CBS Sports (1975-1987)
He did play-by-play for the NFL on CBS from 1975 to 1981, and again in 1986 (among his partners were Johnny Unitas, Sonny Jurgensen, Hank Stram, and John Madden, all members of the Pro Football Hall of Fame) and the 1981 NBA Finals along with color commentators Rick Barry and Bill Russell, both members of the Basketball Hall of Fame.

He was CBS' first play-by-play announcer for the network's coverage of the NCAA Division I men's basketball tournament, calling the Final Four alongside Billy Packer in 1982, 1983 and 1984. In 1982 and 1983, he was CBS' lead college football play-by-play man.

ABC Sports (1987-1992)
On October 26, 1987, Bender (along with Lynn Swann) called the Monday Night Football game between the Denver Broncos and the Minnesota Vikings. That game had been scheduled for October 25, but when the Minnesota Twins (who at the time, shared the Hubert H. Humphrey Metrodome with the Vikings) played Game 7 of the World Series that day, the football game was moved to Monday and shown to a regional audience.

In 1988, Bender did play-by-play for the American League Championship Series alongside Baseball Hall of Famers Joe Morgan and Reggie Jackson.

He also announced college football games for ABC Sports, where he formerly worked alongside Dick Vermeil.

Major League Baseball on ABC
As previously mentioned, Bender did play-by-play for the 1988 American League Championship Series between the Oakland Athletics and Boston Red Sox. Bender spent two years (1987-1988) as the #2 baseball play-by-play man for ABC behind Al Michaels. Bender worked the backup Monday Night Baseball broadcasts (with Tim McCarver in 1987 and Joe Morgan in 1988) as well as serving as a field reporter/post-game interviewer for ABC's 1987 World Series coverage.

Gary Bender would ultimately be taken off ABC's baseball team in favor of Gary Thorne in 1989.

TNT Sports
Bender also called NFL games for TNT from 1992 to 1994, teaming with Pat Haden.  On December 17, 2009, Bender filled in for Marv Albert, who was battling throat problems, to call the Phoenix Suns at Portland Trail Blazers game on TNT and called the game with Reggie Miller.

FSN-Arizona and Versus
As previously mentioned, for 18 years, Bender was the television play-by-play announcer on Fox Sports Net (FSN-Arizona) for the National Basketball Association's Phoenix Suns; he worked alongside former Suns players Eddie Johnson and Scott Williams. In 2006, he was named as the play-by-play announcer for the Versus network's coverage of Mountain West Conference football, where he would be partnered with former NFL player Glenn Parker.

Personal life
Bender is also co-author with Michael Johnson of the biography Call of the Game, in which he shares his life story, tips on how to become a better broadcaster, and his Christian testimony.

Bender did a series of Kendall Motor Oil commercials in mid-1980s.

In the first five months of 2001, Bender presided as host of the nationally syndicated Focus on the Family radio show after the resignation of previous host Mike Trout (1985–2000) because of an extramarital affair. Bender was replaced on a full-time basis by Focus vice president of broadcasting John Fuller.

Gary Bender is an alumnus of the Kansas Delta chapter of Phi Delta Theta at Wichita State where he received his bachelor's degree. He received his master's degree in radio and TV from the University of Kansas.

His son, Trey, is also a sportscaster and played Pop Warner Little Scholars.

Career timeline

1969–1975: WKOW-TV Madison, Sports Director
1970–1974: Green Bay Packers Play-by-play (radio)
1975: Milwaukee Brewers Play-by-play (TV)
1975–1981, 1986: NFL on CBS Play-by-play
1977, 1979—1986: NBA on CBS Play-by-Play (Lead Play-by-Play from 1980—1981)
1981–1987: College Basketball on CBS Play-by-Play (Lead Play-by-Play from 1981–1984)
1982–1986: College Football on CBS Play-by-Play (Lead Play-by-play in 1982 and 1983)
1987–1988: MLB on ABC #2 Play-by-Play
1987: World Series Reporter
1987–1992: College Football on ABC Play-by-Play
1988–1991: Phoenix Cardinals Play-by-Play
1992–1994: NFL on TNT Play-by-Play
1992–2011: Phoenix Suns Play-by-Play on FSN Arizona
1995–1998: St. Louis Rams Play-by-play (radio)
1999–2000: Chicago Bears Play-by-play (radio)
2003–2005: College Football on ESPN Play-by-Play
2006: College Football on Versus Play-by-Play

References

External links

Hall-of-Fame sportscaster calls life as he sees it 

1940 births
Living people
American radio sports announcers
American television sports announcers
Arizona Cardinals announcers
Chicago Bears announcers
College basketball announcers in the United States
College football announcers
Golf writers and broadcasters
Green Bay Packers announcers
Kansas Jayhawks basketball
Kansas Jayhawks football announcers
Major League Baseball broadcasters
Milwaukee Brewers announcers
National Basketball Association broadcasters
National Football League announcers
People from Norton, Kansas
People from Ulysses, Kansas
Phoenix Suns announcers
St. Louis Rams announcers
Tampa Bay Buccaneers announcers
United States Football League announcers
Wisconsin Badgers men's basketball
Wisconsin Badgers football announcers
Major Indoor Soccer League (1978–1992) commentators